Benthamaspis is an extinct genus from a well-known class of fossil marine arthropods, the trilobites. It lived during the early part of the Arenig stage of the Ordovician Period, a faunal stage which lasted from approximately 478 to 471 million years ago.

References

Proetida genera
Early Ordovician trilobites of Europe
Fossils of Ireland
Fossils of Canada
Ordovician trilobites of North America
Paleontology in North Dakota
Paleozoic life of Alberta
Paleozoic life of Newfoundland and Labrador